A GeoPackage (GPKG) is an open, non-proprietary, platform-independent and standards-based data format for geographic information system implemented as a SQLite database container. Defined by the Open Geospatial Consortium (OGC) with the backing of the US military and published in 2014, GeoPackage has seen widespread support from various government, commercial, and open source organizations.

Origin
Despite dozens of file formats and services for exchanging geospatial data, there was not an open format which could support both raster and vector data, while being efficiently decodable by software, particularly in mobile devices. This need was formally expressed at the OGC in 2012. The candidate standard was approved by the OGC in February 2014.

Format
A GeoPackage is built up as an extended SQLite 3 database file (*.gpkg) containing data and metadata tables with specified definitions, integrity assertions, format limitations and content constraints.
The GeoPackage standard describes a set of conventions (requirements) for storing vector features, tile matrix sets of imagery and raster maps at various scales, schema and metadata. 
A GeoPackage can be extended by using the extension rules as defined in clause 2.3 of the standard. The OGC GeoPackage standard specifies a set of OGC member approved extensions in Annex F. Additional (vendor specific) extensions may also be added by following the rules for GeoPackage extensions, however doing so can impact interoperability.

GeoPackage was designed to be as lightweight as possible and be contained in one ready-to-use single file. This makes it suitable for mobile applications in disconnected mode and rapid sharing on cloud storage, USB drives, etc. The GeoPackage extension F.3 RTree Spatial Indexes specifies how to use SQLite spatial indexes in order to speed up performance on spatial queries compared to traditional geospatial files formats.

References

External links
 Geopackage website - Containing implementation guidelines, sample data, etc.

Geopackage format description on digitalpreservation

Open Geospatial Consortium
Open standards
GIS file formats
SQLite